The 1938 National League Division One was the tenth season of the highest tier of motorcycle speedway in Great Britain.

Summary
The only change from the previous season was Bristol Bulldogs moving up from the Provincial League and Hackney Wick Wolves moving down to take their place. They also swapped licences and riders as well as divisions.

New Cross Rangers won their first national title.

Final table

Top Ten Riders

National Trophy
The 1938 National Trophy was the eighth edition of the Knockout Cup.

Qualifying rounds
Norwich Stars won the Division Two final and therefore secured a place in the quarter finals.

Quarterfinals

Semifinals

Final

First leg

Second leg

Wimbledon were National Trophy Champions, winning on aggregate 123-92.

A.C.U Cup
The 1938 Auto-Cycle Union Cup was the fifth edition of the Cup and was won by West Ham Hammers, which ended the five year winning run of Belle Vue. The groups were decided on the number of heat points scored within matches, rather than match wins.

First round
Group 1

Group 2

Final

See also
List of United Kingdom Speedway League Champions
Knockout Cup (speedway)

References

Speedway National League
1938 in speedway
1938 in British motorsport